Thomas Kay Adamson was a Scottish professional footballer, best remembered for his time as a left back in the Football League with Bury and Brentford. He later had a short tenure as player-manager of Irish League club Ards.

Playing career

Early years and Bury 
A left back, Adamson began his career at Scottish junior clubs Craighead, Cambuslang Rangers, Blantyre Celtic and moved to England to join Second Division club Bury in 1920. Over the course of 9 years at Gigg Lane, Adamson made 286 appearances and helped the Shakers to promotion back to the First Division in the 1923–24 season.

Brentford 
Adamson dropped down to the Third Division South to sign for Brentford prior to the beginning of the 1929–30 season. He immediately broke into the team and made 36 appearances during his debut season, a campaign memorable for the Bees' record-breaking 21 home wins. 

Adamson was a mainstay of the team for the following two seasons and made 28 appearances to help the Bees to the Third Division South title in the 1932–33 season. Age caught up to Adamson and he made just eight appearances during the 1933–34 Second Division season, before departing Griffin Park at the end of the campaign. Adamson made 153 appearances in five seasons with the Bees.

Stockport County 
Adamson returned to the Manchester area to sign for Third Division North club Stockport County in 1934. He failed to make an appearance for the club and ended his Football League career in 1935, having failed to score in over 400 professional matches.

Managerial career 
Adamson had a short spell as player-manager of Irish League club Ards in 1935. Former Brentford full back partner Alexander Stevenson was one of his signings.

Personal life 
While growing up, Adamson went to school with future Scottish internationals Hughie Gallacher and Alex James.

Career statistics

Honours 
Blantyre Celtic

 Lanarkshire Cup: 1919–20

Brentford
 Football League Third Division South: 1932–33

References

Scottish footballers
Brentford F.C. players
Bury F.C. players
Stockport County F.C. players
English Football League players
Year of death missing
Ards F.C. managers
NIFL Premiership managers
Blantyre Celtic F.C. players
Association football fullbacks
1901 births
Footballers from North Lanarkshire
Scottish football managers
Date of death unknown
Scottish Junior Football Association players
Cambuslang Rangers F.C. players